The Yellow Fortress or Yellow Bastion (Bosnian, Croatian and) is a cannon fortress at the entrance of the "Walled City of Vratnik". It was built between 1727 and 1739 in area called Jekovac, close to the Jajce Barracks and the Jekovac water reservoir. It served as one of the defense points against the Austro-Hungarian troops in 1878. The fortress was damaged and rebuilt several times. The most recent renovation took place in 1998.

See also

 Bijela Tabija
 Vratnik

References

National Monuments of Bosnia and Herzegovina
Architecture in Bosnia and Herzegovina
Buildings and structures in Sarajevo
Forts in Bosnia and Herzegovina